Washington Street–Monument Circle Historic District is a national historic district located at Indianapolis, Indiana.  The district encompasses 40 contributing buildings and 2 contributing structures in the central business district of Indianapolis centered on Monument Circle. It developed between about 1852 and 1946, and includes representative examples of Italianate, Greek Revival, and Art Deco style architecture. Eighteen of the contributing buildings are individually listed on the National Register of Historic Places. Other notable buildings include the L.S. Ayres & Co. Department Store (1905 and later), Kahn Tailoring Company Building (1915), Hannaman and Duzan Building (1852), Odd Fellows Building (1907–1908), Hotel Harrison (1927–1928), Guaranty Building (1922–1923), Circle Tower (1929–1930), Consolidated Building (1909), and Turner Building and Savings Association (1941).

It was listed on the National Register of Historic Places in 1997.

References

Historic districts on the National Register of Historic Places in Indiana
Greek Revival architecture in Indiana
Italianate architecture in Indiana
Art Deco architecture in Indiana
Historic districts in Indianapolis
National Register of Historic Places in Indianapolis